Anais is a commune in the Charente-Maritime department in the Nouvelle-Aquitaine region of southwestern France.

The inhabitants of the commune are known as Anaisiens or Anaisiennes

Geography
Anais is located some 15 km east of La Rochelle and 5 km south by south-east of Nuaille-d'Aunis. It can be accessed by the D107 road from Dompierre-sur-Mer in the west passing through the centre of the commune south of the village and continuing to Bouhet. The D113 road also comes from Virson in the south passing through the southern part of the commune and continuing north-east to Le Gué-d'Alleré. Access to the village in the north of the commune is only by small country roads running off the D107 and the D113. Apart from the small village of Anais there is also a larger village called Les Grandes-Rivieres located on the D113 road.

The Curé stream forms the eastern boundary of the commune and the Virson forms the northern part of the western boundary and they both meet at a place called le Gouffre (the Pit) which is the start of the Canal du Curé on the municipal boundary of the neighbouring commune of Angliers.

The small village of Anais is built on a low limestone hill, at an altitude of about 13 metres, and it is surrounded by numerous marshes, being located in the southern part of the Marais Poitevin which belongs geographically and historically the plain of Aunis.

It is in this part of the Marais Poitevin that the course of the Curé enters the vast marshy bowl after leaving the last calcareous soils of Aunis in the neighbouring commune of Bouhet.

Neighbouring communes and villages

Administration

List of Successive Mayors

Population

Distribution of Age Groups
The population of the commune is younger than the departmental average.

Percentage Distribution of Age Groups in Anais and Charente-Maritime Department in 2017

Source: INSEE

Sites and Monuments
The Church of Saint Peter from the 10th century.

Transport

Nearest Railway Stations and Halts
Surgères (TGV) 14 km
Mer 17.8 km
Aytré (halt) 18.1 km
Mauzé-sur-le-Mignon (halt) 18.2 km
Châtelaillon 18.5 km

Nearest Airport and aerodromes
La Rochelle (Laleu) 22.1 km
Rochefort-Saint-Agnant 33.8 km
Niort-Souché 41.4 km

See also
Communes of the Charente-Maritime department

References

External links
Anais on the National Geographic Institute website 
Anais on Géoportail, National Geographic Institute (IGN) website 
Ancix on the 1750 Cassini Map

Communes of Charente-Maritime